Aegus and Roscillus were two chiefs of the Allobroges, who had served Julius Caesar with great fidelity in the Gallic Wars, and were treated by him with great distinction.  They accompanied him in his campaigns against Pompey, but having been reproved by Caesar on account of depriving the cavalry of its pay and appropriating the booty to themselves, they deserted to Pompey in Greece.  Aegus was afterwards killed in an engagement between the cavalry of Caesar and Pompey.

References

Duos
Celtic warriors
Celts
Gaulish rulers
Barbarian people of the Gallic Wars
1st-century BC rulers in Europe
Allobroges